Théodore Zué Nguema (9 November 1973 – 5 May 2022) was a professional football player and manager. He played as a striker. Born in Equatorial Guinea, he represented the Gabon national team between 1995 and 2005, scoring 23 goals in 77 appearances.

Club career
Originally from Mongomo, Equatorial Guinea, Nguema moved to Oyem, Gabon (37km east of Mongomo) and began playing football in local club Santé Sports d'Oyem. He later played for fellow Gabonese sides USM Libreville and Mbilinga FC, for Angers SCO in France, for ES Zarzis in Tunisia, for S.C. Braga in Portugal and for FC 105 Libreville and Téléstar back in Gabon.

International career
Nguema has also played for Gabon national team and participated at the 2000 African Cup of Nations where they were eliminated in the group stages. He played for the side that finished third at the 2005 CEMAC Cup.

Managerial career
After his playing retirement, Nguema returned back to Mongomo and managed Real Castel and Estrellas del Futuro (later known as Futuro Kings FC).

Death
Nguema died on 5 May 2022 in Bata, Equatorial Guinea.

Notes

References

External links

1973 births
2022 deaths
People from Mongomo
Gabonese people of Equatoguinean descent
Equatoguinean emigrants
Immigrants to Gabon
People with acquired Gabonese citizenship
Sportspeople of Equatoguinean descent
Gabonese footballers
Association football forwards
Gabon international footballers
2000 African Cup of Nations players
Primeira Liga players
USM Libreville players
Angers SCO players
Mbilinga FC players
ES Zarzis players
S.C. Braga players
FC 105 Libreville players
Delta Téléstar players
Gabonese expatriate footballers
Gabonese expatriate sportspeople in Portugal
Expatriate footballers in Portugal
Gabonese expatriate sportspeople in France
Expatriate footballers in France
Gabonese expatriate sportspeople in Tunisia
Expatriate footballers in Tunisia
Gabonese football managers
Equatoguinean football managers
Futuro Kings FC managers
21st-century Gabonese people